Yepifanka is a rural locality (a village) in Spasskoye Rural Settlement, Vologodsky District, Vologda Oblast, Russia. The population was 20 as of 2002.

Geography 
Yepifanka is located 52 km southwest of Vologda (the district's administrative centre) by road. Norobovo is the nearest rural locality.

References 

Rural localities in Vologodsky District